Torped 62 (Torped 2000 in export) is the latest and most modern torpedo used in the Swedish Navy.

In the late 1980s, FFV (today Saab Dynamics AB), began to develop a replacement for the older Torped 613, the main heavy torpedo used by the Swedish navy. In 1991 the company was awarded a contract of 200 million SEK to complete development of the torpedo.
Scheduled to enter service in the mid 1990s, different problems delayed the torpedo for several years. In 2001 the first torpedoes was delivered to the Swedish Defence Material Administration (FMV) for early testing.
The first batch was delivered to the Swedish armed forces in 2004 and was officially handed over to the Swedish Navy by early 2010.

The torpedo has a pump jet propulsion system giving it a maximum speed of over 45+ knots. It can also track several targets and classify them at the same time.                                                      

In 2020 Saab has received a first order from the Swedish Defence Materiel Administration (FMV) for the life extension of the heavyweight torpedo system. The order value is approximately 485 MSEK and deliveries will take place during 2020-2024. This order ensures future development of the heavyweight torpedo, with the possibility for the Torpedo 62 to remain in operation with the Swedish Navy until the mid-2040.

In 2021 Saab has received an order from the Swedish Defence Material Organisation (FMV) for the next phase of the life extension programme of Torpedo 62. The order value is SEK 145 million and deliveries will take place by the end of 2023. The order includes pre-studies and engineering which incorporates subsystem prototypes for improvements of the current torpedo.

References 

Torpedoes of Sweden